Harry Waxman, B.S.C. (3 April 1912 – 24 December 1984) was an English cinematographer.

Born in London, Waxman won an award from the British Society of Cinematographers for Sapphire in 1959. His other films included Brighton Rock (1947), Swiss Family Robinson (1960), The Day the Earth Caught Fire (1961), Crooks in Cloisters (1964), The Nanny (1965), The Anniversary (1968), and The Wicker Man (1973).

Waxman served as a cinematographer in the RAF film unit during World War II.

Selected filmography
 Brighton Rock (1948)
 To the Public Danger (1948)
 Trottie True (1949)
 The Long Memory (1953)
 Sapphire (1959)
 Swiss Family Robinson (1960)
 The Day the Earth Caught Fire (1961)
 Stolen Hours (1962)
 The Bargee (1964)
 Crooks in Cloisters (1964)
 She (1965)
 The Nanny (1965)
 The Family Way (1966)
 The Anniversary (1968)
 Twisted Nerve (1968)
 Wonderwall (1968)
 Till Death Do Us Part (1968)
 There's a Girl in My Soup (1970)
 The Wicker Man (1973)
 Digby, the Biggest Dog in the World (1973)
 Blue Blood (1973)
 The Pink Panther Strikes Again (1976)

References

External links

Biography at Answers.com

1912 births
1984 deaths
British cinematographers

Royal Air Force personnel of World War II